Kelly Dulfer (born 21 March 1994) is a Dutch handball player for Borussia Dortmund and the Dutch national team.

Career
She competed for the national team in the 2013 Møbelringen Cup in Norway. She represented the Netherlands at the 2013 World Women's Handball Championship in Serbia, where she was selected to play the position of centre back on the Dutch team. She made her World Championship debut in the opening match against the Dominican Republic, and scored one goal in the game, which was won 44–21 by the "Oranje" team.

In 2012, she played at the Women's Youth World Handball Championship in Montenegro, where the Dutch team placed tenth.

Dulfer is the daughter of the Dutch international cricketers Eric Dulfer and Ingrid Keijzer.

Achievements

National team
 World Championship:
Silver Medalist: 2015
Bronze Medalist: 2017
 European Championship:
Silver Medalist: 2016
Bronze Medalist: 2018

Domestic competitions
Danish Championship:
Winner: 2018
Danish Cup:
Runner-up: 2017
Bundesliga:
Winner: 2022

International competitions
EHF European League:
Winner: 2022

Individual awards
 All-Star Best Defender of the European Championship: 2018
 HTH Ligaen's Player of the Month: November 2018 and February 2019

References

External links

Dutch female handball players
1994 births
Living people
Sportspeople from Schiedam
Expatriate handball players
Dutch expatriate sportspeople in Denmark
Dutch expatriate sportspeople in Germany
Handball players at the 2016 Summer Olympics
Olympic handball players of the Netherlands
Handball players at the 2020 Summer Olympics
21st-century Dutch women